Karl Arnold (28 October 1940 – 28 February 2012) was a German light-heavyweight weightlifter. He finished in eighth and fifth place at the 1964 and 1968 Summer Olympics, respectively, and won a bronze medal at the 1968 European Championships.

References

External links
Mantek Frank (GDR). iat.uni-leipzig.de

1940 births
2012 deaths
Olympic weightlifters of East Germany
Olympic weightlifters of the United Team of Germany
Weightlifters at the 1964 Summer Olympics
Weightlifters at the 1968 Summer Olympics
German male weightlifters